Iley is a surname. Notable people with the surname include:

 Daniel Iley (born 1996), Scottish gymnast
 Jason Iley, English executive
 Jim Iley (1935–2018), English football player and manager
 John Iley (born 1967), English aerodynamicist

See also
 Riley (surname)
 Tiley